Professor Nalin Kulatilaka is a Sri Lankan born American academic and researcher. Currently, Nalin Kulatilaka is The Wing Tat Lee Family Professor of Management as well as Professor of Finance in the Questrom School of Business at Boston University, Director of the Impact Measurement and Allocation Program, Director of the Susilo Institute of Ethics in a Global Economy, and the Associate Director at the Boston University Institute for Global Sustainability.  

He has also held the Bertil Danielsson Professorship at the Stockholm School of Economics and Göteborg University and the Tamkang Chair at the Tamkang University.

Educated at the Royal College, Colombo, he went on to gain his BSc from the Imperial College London, SM from Harvard University and a PhD from the MIT Sloan School of Management. Prof Kulatilaka received the Association for Investment Management and Research's Graham and Dodd Award 

He is a co-founder of Nine Dot Energy where he is the Chief Strategy Officer. Nalin also co-founded FirstFuel Software Inc. (2009), Glaze Creek Partners (2001), and Lanka Internet ServicesLtd (1994). He sits on the Board of Directors of Assette LLC.

References

Alumni of Royal College, Colombo
Alumni of Imperial College London
Harvard University alumni
MIT Sloan School of Management alumni
Boston University faculty
Academic staff of the Stockholm School of Economics
Sri Lankan emigrants to the United States
Living people
Year of birth missing (living people)
Academic staff of Tamkang University
Sinhalese academics